The 2011 División Intermedia season (officially the 2011 Copa TIGO- Visión Banco for sponsorship reasons) was the 15th season semi-professional football in Paraguay.

It began on March 19 and ended on September 24.

Teams

Standings

Results

Final
Sportivo Carapeguá and Cerro Porteño PF were ended with a same scores, therefore was made a grand final, to determinate the champion of the tournament. The winner was Cerro Porteño PF.

Top goalscorers

All Paraguayans

References

External links
Rsssf

Para2
2